Silver Nemesis is the third serial of the 25th season of the British science fiction television series Doctor Who. It was first broadcast in the United Kingdom on BBC1 in three weekly parts from 23 November (the 25th anniversary) to 7 December 1988. In New Zealand, all three parts were broadcast on TVNZ on 25 November.

In the serial, the neo-Nazi De Flores (Anton Diffring), the 17th-century sorceress Lady Peinforte (Fiona Walker), and the Cyberman vie for control of the Nemesis, a statue containing a living metal which crash-landed near Windsor Castle in 1988.

The serial marks the final appearance of the Cybermen in the original run.

Plot

The Seventh Doctor and Ace visit England, where three rival factions—the Cybermen, a group of neo-Nazis, and a 17th-century sorceress named Lady Peinforte—are attempting to gain control of a statue made of a living metal, validium, that was created by Omega and Rassilon as the ultimate defence for Gallifrey.

The statue's components - a bow, an arrow, and the figure itself - must be brought together in order for it to be activated. They have been separated since 1638 when, in order to foil the first attempt by Peinforte to seize it, the Doctor launched the figure into orbit in a powered asteroid.

This asteroid has been approaching the Earth at twenty-five yearly intervals ever since, leaving a succession of disasters in its wake, and has now crash-landed near Windsor Castle.

The Doctor plays the three factions against one another and eventually appears to concede defeat to the Cyber Leader. This is just part of a carefully laid trap, and the Cybermen's fleet is totally wiped out by the statue.

Production
The working titles for this story included The Harbinger and Nemesis. Writer Kevin Clarke, who appears twice in the serial itself playing a tourist at Windsor, discusses the development of the plot on the DVD. He points out that he had seen very little of Doctor Who and that he met the production team without any idea of what his proposed story would be about. He made up a story on the spot in front of producer John Nathan-Turner that the Doctor is literally God, though this was not realised on-screen. The Cybermen were added later at the request of Nathan-Turner, to tie in with the programme's silver anniversary.

Locations
Permission was refused for filming at Windsor Castle so those scenes were shot at Arundel Castle. According to the DVD commentary, scenes were shot in woodland areas around Arundel Castle, notably the climax of Part Two, when the Doctor and Ace discuss the Cyber-threat while sitting near a fallen tree. The damaged and fallen trees were a result of the recent storm of 1987 that had caused widespread damage throughout southern England. Scenes at the gas works where The Doctor and Ace meet and combat the Cybermen were filmed on the site that later became the O2 (formerly the Millennium Dome).

Cast notes
Fiona Walker had appeared in The Keys of Marinus in 1964 as Kala. Leslie French, who plays the Mathematician, had turned down the role of The Doctor in 1963; thus, his casting was another nod to the series' beginnings in this Silver Anniversary story. Anton Diffring's performance in Silver Nemesis was his last before his death in 1989. The production team tried to get Prince Edward involved in the show, but his office politely declined in March 1988; the programme instead used an Elizabeth II look-alike. Nicholas Courtney makes a cameo appearance, conversing with other visitors in the queue to tour Windsor Castle.

Broadcast and reception

Part One was transmitted on the 25th anniversary of the first episode of Doctor Who. Parts Two and Three were the second and third respectively of the series ever to be premiered outside of the United Kingdom (the first being The Five Doctors), shown on 25 November as part of a compilation broadcast of the story on New Zealand's TVNZ, after Part One had shown in the UK but before the other two were transmitted there.

Paul Cornell, Martin Day, and Keith Topping wrote of the serial in The Discontinuity Guide (1995), "A bit of a mess, really. Some passable scenes, but the story lacks pace and character involvement. Its plot is virtually identical to Remembrance of the Daleks only two stories previously." In 2012, Mark Braxton of Radio Times said that the story had "a certain comic-strip effervescence" despite many of the plot points not going well together or missing the mark. DVD Talk's Ian Jane gave Silver Nemesis three out of five stars, describing it as "phoned in" and a remake of Remembrance of the Daleks. However, he felt that the story was still enjoyable due to the chemistry between McCoy and Aldred, as well as the faster pace. SFX reviewer Ian Berriman said that the story was too ambitious, and criticised the Cybermen. Despite this, he noted that the serial still had "a great concept, ... some cool moments, a couple of enjoyably awful puns and one superb character: nutjob Jacobean villainess Lady Peinforte". Alasdair Wilkins of io9 wrote that it is "not an unmitigated disaster, but it's definitely the worst of classic Doctor Who creative resurgence in its final two seasons". He also felt that the story packed in too many elements and did not do much with the Cybermen. Den of Geek listed the Cybermen's reaction to jazz as one of the "great things in not-so-great [Doctor Who] episodes".

Commercial releases

In print

A novelisation of this serial, by Kevin Clarke, was published by Target Books in November 1989.

Home media
On 3 May 1993, an extended version of this three-part serial was released on VHS. Apart from featuring footage not shown in the original broadcast, the video included an hour-long documentary made by New Jersey Network during the production of the adventure and featuring interviews with cast and crew. This documentary was not included on the 2010 DVD release due to rights issues. The broadcast version of this serial only was released on DVD as part of a box set with Revenge of the Cybermen on 9 August 2010.

Extended VHS release (1993)

References

External links

Target novelisation

On Target — Silver Nemesis

Seventh Doctor serials
Doctor Who pseudohistorical serials
Doctor Who serials novelised by Kevin Clarke
Cybermen television stories
Fiction set in 1638
Fiction set in 1988
1988 British television episodes